The European Prospective Investigation into Cancer and Nutrition (EPIC) study is a Europe-wide prospective cohort study of the relationships between diet and cancer, as well as other chronic diseases, such as cardiovascular disease. With over half a million participants, it is the largest study of diet and disease to be undertaken.

EPIC is coordinated by the International Agency for Research on Cancer (IARC), part of the World Health Organization, and funded by the "Europe Against Cancer" programme of the European Commission as well as multiple nation-specific grants and charities.

521,457 healthy adults, mostly aged 35–70 years, were enrolled in 23 centres in ten European countries: Denmark (11%), France (14%), Germany (10%), Greece (5%), Italy (9%), The Netherlands (8%), Norway (7%), Spain (8%), Sweden (10%) and the United Kingdom (17%). One UK centre (Oxford) recruited 27,000 vegetarians and vegans; this subgroup forms the largest study of this dietary group. Recruitment to the study took place between 1993 and 1999, and follow-up is planned for at least ten years, with repeat interview/questionnaires every three to five years. The main prospective data collected are standardised dietary questionnaires (self-administered or interview-based), seven-day food diaries, blood samples and anthropometric measurements, such as body mass index and waist-to-hip ratio. Additionally, the GenAir case-control study is studying the relationship of passive smoking and air pollution with cancers and respiratory diseases.

Up to 2004, there were over 26,000 new cases of cancer recorded among participants, with the most common being cancers of the breast, colorectum, prostate and lung. Current analyses are focusing particularly on stomach, colorectal, breast, prostate and lung cancers. The different dietary patterns in the different countries should enable reliable associations to be made between particular diets and cancers. The analysis of stored blood samples should also allow dissection of genetic factors involved in cancers, as well as the effects of hormones and hormone-like factors.

Key findings 
The study and its analysis is ongoing, but key results of the study retrieved in 2008 are:
Lowered sodium from salt intake, high potassium from fruit and vegetable consumption promote healthy blood pressure levels
High physical activity, involving some high impact activities is a good indicator of longevity and low risk of bone fractures
High dietary fibre protects against bowel cancer
Obesity increases a number of cancer risks
High levels of sex hormones increase risk of breast cancer
Increased fat intake increases the risk of breast cancer
Increases in eating fruit and vegetables reduces the risk from all causes of an early death
High blood glucose levels are associated with increased risk of heart disease
The combined impact of four behaviours – not smoking, being physically active, moderate alcohol intake and the consumption of at least five fruit and vegetable servings a day – was estimated to amount to 14 additional years of life (Khaw et al. 2008)

Subsequent findings from 2012 and 2013 are:
Dietary flavonoid intake is associated with reduced gastric carcinoma risk in women but not men
Regular consumption of processed meat increases the risk of cardiovascular diseases and death from cancer
Subsequent findings from 2021 are:

 Dietary factors associated with reduced cancer mortality included raw vegetable intake; dietary fiber intake; the Mediterranean diet; other diet patterns included low meat eaters, vegetarians/vegans, or fish eaters.

Notes

Selected papers
Review

Primary

External links 
EPIC project (IARC)
EPIC study (CR UK)
EPIC (Oxford centre) (preferentially recruited vegetarians & vegans)
EPIC-Norfolk (UK Norfolk cohort)

Epidemiological study projects
Nutritional science
Oncology